Marta Sales-Pardo (born 1976) is a Spanish statistical physicist, complex systems scientist, and network scientist. She is an associate professor at Rovira i Virgili University, in the Department of Chemical Engineering. She is notable for her contributions to complex networks, where she has studied both social and biochemical systems, especially the contribution of each node or individual to the overall network. Her research has earned several mentions in the Fulbright Program and the ICREA Program, among others.

Education and career 

Sales-Pardo earned a Bachelors of Science in Physics from the University of Barcelona in 1998. She then earned a PhD in Physics from the University of Barcelona in 2002, advised by Felix Ritort. In 2003, she became a post-doctoral fellow at the Chemical and Biological Engineering Department at Northwestern University. She obtained the Fulbright scholarship in 2004 for two years, and in 2008 became a research assistant professor at Northwestern University. Since 2010, she has been an Associate Professor at Rovira i Virgili University.

Research

Sales-Pardo is most well-known for her studies on complex networks, including a paper studying the statistical significance of modularity in randomly-generated complex networks. Her most cited works discuss how to mine data from large complex networks accurately, successfully capturing the properties of the mined distribution.

Recognition
In 2021, Sales-Pardo was named a Fellow of the Network Science Society, "for her contributions to the understanding of the organisation of large-scale networks and the development of generative models and inference methodologies for complex networks". She was the first Spanish woman to win this honor.

References

External links
Home page (SEES lab)

Living people
Spanish physicists
Spanish women physicists
University of Barcelona alumni
Academic staff of the University of Rovira i Virgili
1976 births